is one of five major general contractors in Japan. Takenaka provides architectural, engineering, and construction services and has its headquarters located in Chūō-ku, Osaka, Osaka Prefecture. Takenaka has eight domestic offices in Japan with overseas offices in Asia, Europe, and the United States. It has remained under family control since the founding of Takenaka Corporation in 1609, and is currently led by the 17th generation of the family.

The Takenaka corporation designed and built the Takenaka Carpentry Tools Museum.

About Takenaka 
In 1610 Tobei Masataka Takenaka (竹中 藤兵衛正高), a shrine and temple carpenter, started a business in Nagoya. The business continued as a family business and built some of the first Western-style buildings in Japan during the last half of 19th century, most of them in Nagoya. In 1899 Toemon Takenaka (竹中 藤右衛門), a 14th generation descendant of the original founder established a branch office in Kobe and founded Takenaka Corporation as an official company.

The company grew during the 20th century; its capital in 1909 was about ¥100,000. This rose to ¥6 million in 1938, ¥1.5 billion in 1959 and ¥50 billion in 1979. Today, Takenaka Corporation is a multinational company with offices in 18 different countries. The current president is Toichi Takenaka (竹中 統一) (since June 2004).

The Takenaka Corporation claims to be the oldest operating firms of its type in the world. In 2006 Takenaka acquired competing family architect-carpentry business (Miyadaiku) Kongō Gumi which had been in operation for 1,427 years.

The company is now regarded in Japan as one of the "Big Five" contractors ranked alongside Kajima, Obayashi, Shimizu and Taisei. The firm has built some of the most important buildings in Japan, including the Tokyo Tower, the Tokyo Dome (the first large-scale stadium with an air-supported membrane roof in Japan), the Fukuoka Dome (Japan's first large-scale stadium with a retractable roof), and the Kobe Meriken Park Oriental Hotel among others.

Among its current proposals is the Sky City 1000 project.

Takenaka reconstructed the Suzakumon in Nara.

History timeline 
1610 (Keicho 15 years) – Takenaka Tobei Masataka, a former vassal of Oda Nobunaga, established a carpentry team in Nagoya. His work mainly involved erecting shrines and temples.
1899 (Meiji 1957) – Takenaka Tozaemon XIV moved to Kobe, and founded the official company. They built Mitsui Bank Kobe Onohama warehouse.
1923 (Taisho 12 years) – the head office in Osaka is moved to Kobe.
1935 – Kobe mosque construction.
1937 (Showa 12 years) – Established Takenaka Corporation. ¥1.5 million in capital. President Takenaka Tozaemon.
1945 – Tozaemon Takenaka appointed as Chairman of the Board and Renichi Takenaka appointed as President.
1958 – Tokyo Tower construction.
1980 – Takenaka Renichi appointed as Chairman of the Board and Takenaka Toichi appointed as President.
1984 – Takenaka Carpentry Tools Museum opened.
1988 – Tokyo Dome completed.
1993 (Heisei 5 years) – Fukuoka Dome completed, Japan's first roof-retractable multi-purpose stadium
1997 – Osaka Dome, Nagoya Dome, International Stadium Yokohama completed.
2004 – The Tokyo Main Office moves to new building in Koto-ward in Tokyo.
2006 – Midland Square (Nagoya) completed.
2007 – Tokyo Midtown, Shin-Marunouchi Building completed.
2010 – 400th anniversary of the company.
2013 – Masahiro Miyashita becomes president, the first from outside the founding family.

Issues

Insufficient reinforcement 
 On November 19, 2007, during the construction of a 27-story (94 meter high) highrise condominium in Minato, Tokyo, the whole 8th and 9th floors of the building had to be dismantled and rebuilt because the reinforcing steel used was of insufficient strength.

Industrial accident cover-ups 
 According to a report of December 28, 2007, a 52-year-old foreman of a Takenaka condominium construction site in Fukushima ward, Osaka, reported an industrial accident in which a falling concrete hose seriously injured a worker of sub-contractor, Airtech Co., Ltd. The accident was reported as having happened at a different demolition site that the foreman was also in charge of. Takenaka and Airtech were issued a summary indictment by the Osaka prosecutor's office for violating the Industrial Safety and Health Act.
 Takenaka also announced on December 19, 2007, that it had failed to report an industrial accident at a Toyota factory it was building in Kariya City, Aichi Prefecture, and that it was under investigation for violation of the Industrial Safety and Health Act.

Tax evasion (non-reporting of income) 
 In March 2013, it was discovered that the Osaka National Tax Office had reprimanded the company for failing to declare about ¥30 million of income (¥9 million of it intentionally) between 2008 and 2011.
 In April 2015, the same office reprimanded the company again for underreporting its income for the four years between 2010 and 2013 by about ¥150 million.

Leaky subway 
 On September 25, 2014, train services at Nagoya Station on the Higashiyama Subway Line were suspended for nine hours due to water leaking into the station as a result of construction work the company was carrying out on the JR Tower Nagoya building.

Falling window 
 On February 17, 2015, a window frame weighing approximately 100 kg fell from the 4th floor of the Kofu City Hall building, which had been built by the company and two other companies. A subsequent investigation by Kofu City found 87 defects in the building. Executives of Takenaka and the other two companies involved, Nihon Sekkei and Sankyo Tateyama, visited the mayor of Kofu on March 20, 2015, to apologize.

Selected projects

Public facilities 
Nagoya TV Tower
Tokyo Tower
Nippon Budokan
Kansai-kan of the National Diet Library
Okinawa Convention Center
Hankyu Umeda Station
Kobe Port Tower

Commercial facilities 
Prada Tokyo (with Herzog and de Meuron)
Miu Miu Tokyo (with Herzog and de Meuron)
Maison Hermes (with Renzo Piano)
Expocity

Historic buildings and religious architecture 
Suzakumon
Church of St. Ignatius
Meiji Seimei Kan
Seishoji temple
Imperial Military Academy
Kobe Union Church

Schools 
Kwansei Gakuin University UekeHara Campus Mita Campus
Keio University (Shinanomachi) School of Medicine Integrated Medical Research Building
Sophia University Building No. 2
Meiji University Liberty Tower
Konan University 13 Building
Kobe Gakuin University Port Island campus
Kobe International University
Kansai University Naofumikan
Kansai University Takatsuki Muse campus
Kawasaki College of Allied Health Professions gymnasium
Tokyo University of Science Oshamambe campus

Sports stadiums 
Tokyo Dome
Osaka Dome
Sapporo Dome
Fukuoka Dome
Nagoya Dome
International Stadium Yokohama
Okayama Prefecture athletics stadium Momotaro Stadium
Ibaraki Prefectural Kashima Soccer Stadium

Office buildings 
Abenobashi Terminal Building – Harukas tallest building in Japan, design collaboration with César Pelli
Midland Square
Shin-Marunouchi Building
Tokyo Midtown
Crystal Tower
TV Asahi new headquarters
Umeda Hankyu Building
Kobe Hankyu Building
Tokyo Shiodome Building
Second Yoshimoto Building
Shin Umeda City, Umeda Sky Building
Nippon Club Tower
Tokyo Sankei Building
Pacific Century Place Marunouchi
Chuo Mitsui Trust and Banking Co., Ltd. Head Office Building
Nintendo headquarters building
Kikkoman Noda headquarters
Kyocera headquarters building
Tokyo Opera City
Morita headquarters building
Asahi Broadcasting Corporation building (firefly town) Asahi Broadcasting Corporation old building, Osaka Tower, Hotel Plaza demolition
Audio-Technica new Headquarters
CapitaGreen, Singapore

Museums and theme parks 
21st Century Museum of Contemporary Art, Kanazawa, Kanazawa (with SANAA)
Sagawa Art Museum
Museum of Contemporary Art, Tokyo
Otsuka Museum of Art
MOA Museum of Art
Ikuo Hirayama Museum of Art
Pola Museum of Art
Izumi City Kubo Sou Memorial Museum of Art
Tempozan Harbor Village, Kaiyukan
Shima Spain Village
Takenaka Carpentry Tools Museum

Dwellings 
Kuzunoha Tower City
Moto-Azabu Hills
Rokko Island City, "East Court 11 Avenue"
Elsa Tower 55
Tennozu View Tower
CapitaGreen (with Toyo Ito)

Plants and research laboratories 
Suntory World Research Center
Zeria Pharmaceutical Tsukuba Plant
Toyota Industries Corporation Information Technology Institute
Nichia headquarters third research building
Tateyama brewing headquarters factory
Sanyo Denki Technology Center
Yanmar Diesel Co., Ltd. Biwa Plant
Stanley Electric Hatano new Building 2

Hotels 
Kobe Meriken Park Oriental Hotel
Kanazawa Manten Hotel Station

Hospitals 
Jichi Medical University Hospital New Building
Kawasaki Medical School Hospital West Wing Building
Kyushu University Hospital South Tower
Kitasato University Hospital new building

See also 

 Nippon Club (New York)

References

External links 
 Takenaka Corporation 
 Takenaka Corporation

Engineering companies of Japan
Construction and civil engineering companies of Japan
Companies based in Osaka Prefecture
1610 establishments in Japan
Companies established in 1610
Science and technology in Japan
Japanese brands